Mr. Orchid is a 1946 French drama film directed by René Clément. It was entered into the 1946 Cannes Film Festival. The film's sets were designed by the art director Lucien Carré.

Cast
 Noël-Noël as Édouard Martin
 Maurice Chevit as Un maquisard
 Alice Leitner
 Georges Questau (as Georges Questiau)
 Simone Lestan
 Maurice Salabert as Le boucher
 Jaqueline Lefer
 Pierre Noël
 Howard Vernon as Le lieutenant Fleischer, l'officier allemand
 Jean Lara as Pelletier (as Jean Varas)
 Nadine Alari as Monique Martin
 José Artur as Pierre Martin
 Claire Olivier as Madame Martin
 Paul Frankeur as Simon
 Jeanne Herviale as Marie

References

External links

1946 films
1940s French-language films
1946 drama films
French black-and-white films
Films directed by René Clément
French drama films
1940s French films
Films about the French Resistance